The 2013–14 TT Pro League season (known as the Digicel Pro League for sponsorship reasons) was the fifteenth season of the TT Pro League, the Trinidad and Tobago professional league for association football clubs, since its establishment in 1999. A total of nine teams contested the league, with Defence Force the defending champions. The season began on 13 September 2013 and concluded on 20 May 2014 with the crowning of W Connection as the league champion.

During the previous league season, Point Fortin Civic gained momentum in returning as a professional club following a streak of solid performances during the 2012 TOYOTA Classic and 2012–13 FA Trophy over Pro League competition. After the previous season had concluded, the Pro League announced that T&TEC had withdrawn from the league citing financial difficulties to sustain its football operations. As a result, Point Fortin Civic announced its intentions to apply for Pro League membership on 16 August 2013. The following month, the club officially made its return to the Pro League after being granted membership. Furthermore, the Pro League announced on 10 September 2013 that San Juan Jabloteh were also re-admitted into the league following the club's one-year absence due to difficulties securing a long-term sponsor.

The first goal of the season was scored by Defence Force's Kerry Joseph against Central FC in the seventh minute of the first game on 13 September 2013. The following day, Kurt Frederick of W Connection recorded the first hat-trick of the season as the Savonetta Boys shutout St. Ann's Rangers 7–0 in Hasely Crawford Stadium. Marcus Joseph used hat-tricks on consecutive starts in wins over Police and St. Ann's Rangers, respectively, to claim his first Golden Boot with 16 goals for Point Fortin Civic.

On 6 May 2014, W Connection used an emphatic 4–1 win over defending champions Defence Force at Hasely Crawford Stadium to be crowned champions for a Pro League record fifth time (2000, 2001, 2005, and 2011–12). The league championship marked the second Pro League title in three seasons for the Savonetta Boys and their second domestic double after claiming the FA Trophy earlier in the season. In addition, having finished as the league champions, W Connection qualified for the 2015 CFU Club Championship. One week later, Central FC also qualified for the Caribbean Club Championship following a 3–0 win against St. Ann's Rangers and a Defence Force 1–0 loss to San Juan Jabloteh during the final round of matches.

However, the season was overshadowed by the death of Defence Force and national team midfielder Kevon Carter from a sudden heart attack following a team training session on the morning of 28 February 2014. Carter complained of chest pains after training at Macqueripe and was taken to the army's medical department. He was subsequently driven to Community Hospital of Seventh-Day Adventists in St. James where Carter was pronounced dead before receiving treatment.

Changes from the 2012–13 season
The following changes were made since the 2012–13 season:
 Central FC and Walsall of Football League One agreed to a partnership that featured the Saddlers in a pre-season tour of Trinidad and Tobago.
 During the pre-season tour, Walsall participated in coaching clinics and exhibition matches against Stokely Vale, Central FC, and a Pro League XI.
 Dexter Skeene, Pro League CEO, announced that the prize money awarded to the Pro League champions was increased to TT$1 million (up from TT$400,000).
 There were a number of changes to the clubs competing in the 2013–14 season.
 T&TEC withdrew from the league due to financial struggles to continue its football operations.
 Point Fortin Civic applied for admission and were accepted back in the Pro League after a being expelled following the league's inaugural season.
 The club announced a sponsorship agreement with Worldwide Safety and will appear on the front of each match shirt.
 After suspending its football operations, San Juan Jabloteh were re-admitted into the league following a one-year absence.
 Central FC announced on 13 September 2013 that Super Industrial Services had become the main sponsors of the club.
 A six-year sponsorship agreement was reached between St. Ann's Rangers and PlusOne Fashion for US$75,000 each year.

Teams

Team summaries

Note: Flags indicate national team as has been defined under FIFA eligibility rules. Players may hold more than one non-FIFA nationality.

Player transfers

Managerial changes

League table

Positions by round

Results

Matches 1–16

Matches 17–24

Season statistics

Scoring
 First goal of the season: Kerry Joseph for Defence Force against Central FC, 13 September 2013.
 Last goal of the season: Marcus Joseph for Point Fortin Civic against Caledonia AIA, 20 May 2014
 First own goal of the season: Keion Goodridge (San Juan Jabloteh) for Caledonia AIA (26 October 2013)
 First penalty kick of the season: Jason Marcano (scored) for Central FC against Defence Force, 13 September 2013.
 First hat-trick of the season: Kurt Frederick (W Connection) against St. Ann's Rangers, 65', 81', 84' (14 September 2013)
 Most goals scored by one player in a match: 3 goals Kurt Frederick (W Connection) against St. Ann's Rangers, 65', 80', 85' (14 September 2013)
 Clevon McFee (St. Ann's Rangers) against San Juan Jabloteh, 15', 21', 23' (20 September 2013)
 Kerry Baptiste (San Juan Jabloteh) against St. Ann's Rangers, 12', 50', 69' (20 September 2013)
 Trevin Caesar (North East Stars) against Defence Force, 51', 81', 88' (8 October 2013)
 Rundell Winchester (Central FC) against Point Fortin Civic, 21', 46', 49' (22 October 2013)
 Keyon Edwards (Caledonia AIA) against St. Ann's Rangers, 9', 25', 46' (1 November 2013)
 Marcus Joseph (Point Fortin Civic) against Police, 59', 76', 89' (18 January 2014)
 Marcus Joseph (Point Fortin Civic) against St. Ann's Rangers, 6', 55', 74' (21 January 2014)
 Willis Plaza (Central FC) against St. Ann's Rangers, 39', 61', 81' (21 February 2014)
 Dimitrie Apai (W Connection) against Police, 53', 88', 94' (8 April 2014)
 Willis Plaza (Central FC) against Caledonia AIA, 15', 29', 57' (8 April 2014)
 Josimar Belgrave (Defence Force) against Caledonia AIA, 29', 69', 81' (25 April 2014)
 Widest winning margin: 7 goals 
 St. Ann's Rangers 0–7 W Connection (14 September 2013)
 Most goals in a match: 11 goals 
 San Juan Jabloteh 6–5 St. Ann's Rangers (20 September 2013)
 Most goals in one half: 6 goals 
 San Juan Jabloteh v St. Ann's Rangers (20 September 2013) 1–4 at half-time, 6–5 final.
 Most goals in one half by a single team: 5 goals 
 St. Ann's Rangers v W Connection (14 September 2013) 0–2 at half-time, 0–7 final.
 San Juan Jabloteh v St. Ann's Rangers (20 September 2013) 1–4 at half-time, 6–5 final.

Top scorers

Hat-tricks

 * Home team score first in result

Discipline
 First yellow card of the season: Rodell Elcock for Defence Force against Central FC, 13 September 2013.
 First red card of the season: Kern Caesar for St. Ann's Rangers against W Connection, 14 September 2013
 Most yellow cards in a single match: 7 
 W Connection 2–2 Defence Force – 3 for W Connection (Christian Viveros (2) & Juma Clarence) and 4 for Defence Force (Dave Long, Sean Narcis, Rodell Elcock & Ross Russell Jr.) (2 May 2014)
 Most red cards in a single match: 2' 
 Police 0–0 Central FC – 1 for Police (Trent Noel) and 1 for Central FC (Ataullah Guerra) (31 January 2014)

Awards

Monthly awards

References

External links
Official Website
Soca Warriors Online, TT Pro League

TT Pro League seasons
1
Trinidad